The twelfth season of Australian reality television series The Block premiered on 21 August 2016 on the Nine Network. Both hosts Scott Cam (host) and Shelley Craft (Challenge Master) returned from the previous season, as did the three judges: Neale Whitaker, Shaynna Blaze and Darren Palmer.

Production
On 28 October 2015, Nine renewed the series for a twelfth season. Since 2013, the Nine Network has aired two seasons of the show each year. In 2016, however, only one season aired, and it did not air until the last quarter of 2016. It will once again be set in Melbourne. On December 27, 2015, Frank Valentic, teased a video saying that there are rumours of The Block going to Greville Street, Prahran.

On 18 February 2016, it was reported that The Block producers bought an old heritage listed soap factory for $5 million at 164 Ingles St, Port Melbourne,

Filming for the season began on 26 May 2016. The Block auctions (or Block-tions) for the apartments were held on Saturday, 12 November 2016.

This Art Deco heritage building is located at 164 Ingles St and it is an old soap factory in Port Melbourne.

Contestants
The Block 2016 is the fourth season to have five couples instead of the traditional four couples. Julia & Sasha are the first ever female same-sex couple to compete on any season of The Block.

Score history

Results

Judges' scores
 Colour key:
  Highest Score
  Lowest Score

Challenge Scores

Challenge Apartment

Auction

Ratings

Notes
Ratings data is from OzTAM and represents the live and same day average viewership from the 5 largest Australian metropolitan centres (Sydney, Melbourne, Brisbane, Perth and Adelaide).
In Apartment 2 resided a secret vault of which the contents were unknown until it was opened. Whoever selected Apartment 2 (Dan & Carleen) were able to open it and take ownership of the contents within. The vault contained $30,000 worth of products (antiques from the original building and other items) in addition to $40,000 which can be used to extend their renovation budget, take off their reserve price or any combination of the two.
This team used a bonus point they won in a challenge
This team did not present a completed room due to a problem with unleveled flooring
Along with creating their Terraces, each contestant were given $5000 to re-do their worst room. these were their re-do rooms:Will & Karlie - Living RoomDan & Carleen - 1st Guest BedroomAndy & Ben - HallwaySasha & Julia - 1st & 2nd Guest BedroomsChris & Kim - Main Bathroom
The prize money that the team wins get taken off their reserve price
The prize money that the team wins get taken off their reserve price, also in order rank of winning, they get to have their pick of their Auction Spot
This episode was not scheduled to air until 8 November 2016 due to a test cricket telecast, however the episode aired unscheduled when the sporting event ended early, but was not logged in OzTAM ratings reports, thus ratings for the episode are not available.

References

2016 Australian television seasons
12